The African Diplomatic Corps is a body consisting of the 53 ambassadors to the United States that represent African countries. Its goal is to lobby United States politicians and educate diplomats, educators, policy analysts, and the media about current events in Africa. The African Diplomatic Corps founded "Africa Week" in Washington, D.C. and the corps' current leader is Serge Mombouli, Ambassador of the Republic of Congo, who has been its dean since 2015. He succeeded Ambassador Roble Olhaye of Djibouti who died July 22, 2015.

References

See also 
 Diplomatic Corps

Ambassadors to the United States
United States–African relations